Len Cantello (born 11 September 1951) is a former football midfielder.

Career

West Bromwich Albion: 1967–1979
Cantello joined West Bromwich Albion as an apprentice in 1967. Aged 18, Cantello played in the 1970 League Cup Final. Cantello scored ITV's goal of the season in December 1978, playing against Manchester United at Old Trafford. During his 12-year stay at the Hawthorns, Cantello made 371 appearances. In 1978, he played with the Dallas Tornado.

Although signing for Bolton Wanderers in the summer of 1979 for a fee of £350,000, Cantello was awarded a testimonial match by West Bromwich Albion that saw a team of white players play against a team of black players.

Bolton Wanderers: 1979–1982
In 1979, he moved to Bolton Wanderers, spending three years with them.

Later career: 1982–1986
In 1982, Cantello moved two divisions down on loan to Hereford United. He made just one appearance and then moved again on loan to Bury. In 1981, he went on loan to the Dallas Tornado of the North American Soccer League. In 1983, he was transferred to Dutch side SC Cambuur, before finishing with two seasons at Eastern AA. In 1989 and 1990, he played in the Canadian Soccer League with Calgary Strikers and London Lasers.

Post-playing career
After retiring from professional sport, Cantello became the UK managing Director of FieldTurf, a Canadian-based brand of artificial turf playing surface. He currently resides in his home town of Manchester.

References

External links
 
 Len Cantello (West Brom) at Sporting-heroes.net
 Len Cantello (Bolton Wanderers) at Sporting-heroes.net
 NASL stats

1951 births
Living people
English footballers
Footballers from Manchester
West Bromwich Albion F.C. players
Bolton Wanderers F.C. players
Hereford United F.C. players
Bury F.C. players
North American Soccer League (1968–1984) players
Dallas Tornado players
Eastern Sports Club footballers
England under-23 international footballers
English expatriate footballers
Expatriate footballers in Hong Kong
Stockport County F.C. non-playing staff
Association football midfielders
English expatriate sportspeople in Hong Kong
English expatriate sportspeople in the United States
Expatriate soccer players in the United States
Calgary Kickers players
London Lasers players